2MASS J01225093−2439505 is a M-type main-sequence star. Its surface temperature is 3530 K. 2MASS J01225093−2439505 is much younger than the Sun at an age of 0.12 billion years. Kinematically, the star belongs to the AB Doradus moving group.

Multiplicity surveys did not detect any stellar companions to 2MASS J01225093−2439505 as of 2016.

Planetary system
In 2013, one superjovian planet (may be a brown dwarf), named 2MASS J01225093−2439505 b, was discovered by direct imaging. The measured planetary temperature is 1600 K, and it exhibits an unusual, short-lived atmospheric dust type due to its relatively low surface gravity and young age. The planetary spectrum is classified as L3.7. The planetary rotation axis is inclined to its orbit, obliquity is 33°, while the orbit is well aligned with the equatorial plane of the star, misalignment is 1°. The planet is rotating rapidly, with a period of 6.8 hours.

References

Cetus (constellation)
M-type main-sequence stars
Planetary systems with one confirmed planet
J01225093−2439505